Fyodorovskoye is a rural locality (a selo) in Seletskoye Rural Settlement, Suzdalsky District, Vladimir Oblast, Russia. The population was 2 as of 2010.

Geography 
Fyodorovskoye is located 13 km southwest of Suzdal (the district's administrative centre) by road. Turtino is the nearest rural locality.

References 

Rural localities in Suzdalsky District
Suzdalsky Uyezd